Logan Stephenson (born February 19, 1986) is a Canadian professional ice hockey defenceman who currently plays in Japan for the Tohoku Free Blades of the Asian League. He was originally drafted 35th overall in the 2004 NHL Entry Draft by the Phoenix Coyotes. He is the son of Bob Stephenson and the younger brother of Shay Stephenson, who plays for the Norwegian hockeyteam Sparta Warriors. Stephenson's second cousin, Chandler Stephenson, won the Stanley Cup in 2018 with the Washington Capitals.

On July 22, 2015, Stephenson signed a one-year extension to remain in Japan after a successful first season with the Free Blades., and with his accomplishment over the years, was appointed as their Player Coach in July 2018.

Career statistics

Awards and honours

References

External links

1986 births
Living people
Adirondack Phantoms players
Athol Murray College of Notre Dame alumni
Arizona Coyotes draft picks
Canadian expatriate ice hockey players in Japan
Canadian expatriate ice hockey players in Norway
Canadian expatriate ice hockey players in Sweden
Canadian expatriate ice hockey players in the United States
Canadian ice hockey defencemen
Iowa Stars players
Karlskrona HK players
People from Outlook, Saskatchewan
Rockford IceHogs (AHL) players
San Antonio Rampage players
Sparta Warriors players
Tohoku Free Blades players
Tri-City Americans players
Vålerenga Ishockey players
HKM Zvolen players
Canadian expatriate ice hockey players in Romania
Canadian expatriate ice hockey players in Slovakia